The Avery–Helm Historic District comprises a primarily residential portion of central Corvallis, Oregon, United States. Located on several of Corvallis's earliest plats, the 122 historic houses remaining in the district (as of 1999) present a window into the domestic aspects of the city's development from 1870 to 1949, providing a full industrial, socioeconomic, and architectural profile of that period. The district was added to the National Register of Historic Places in 2000.

See also
National Register of Historic Places listings in Benton County, Oregon
Dr. Henry S. Pernot House

References

External links

Historic districts on the National Register of Historic Places in Oregon
National Register of Historic Places in Benton County, Oregon
Corvallis, Oregon